Mateuellus troglobioticus is a species of beetle in the family Carabidae, the only species in the genus Mateuellus.

References

Pterostichinae